Mafizul Islam Khan Kamal is a Gano Forum politician and the former Member of Parliament of Dhaka-3.

Career
Kamal was elected to parliament from Dhaka-3 as a Bangladesh Awami League candidate in 1973. He was the executive President of Gano Forum. He resigned in February 2018.

References

Gano Forum politicians
Living people
1st Jatiya Sangsad members
Year of birth missing (living people)